a junction passenger railway station in the city of Sanmu, Chiba Japan, operated by the East Japan Railway Company (JR East).

Lines
Narutō Station is served by the Sōbu Main Line and Tōgane Line, and is located 76.9 km from the western terminus of the Sōbu Main Line at Tokyo Station. Shiosai limited express services between Tokyo and  stop at this station.

Station layout

Narutō Station has two side platforms and a single island platform, one side of which has a cutout, enabling the station to serve a total of four tracks. Then platforms are connected to the station building by a footbridge. The station has a "Midori no Madoguchi" staffed ticket office.

Platforms

History
Narutō Station opened on 1 May 1897. During World War II, on 13 August 1945, a train containing five passenger carriages and four freight carriages was strafed by American aircraft while stopped at Narutō Station. The freight cars contained four anti-aircraft guns and ammunition, which were ignited in the attack. Although station workers and members of the Imperial Japanese Army 3rd Guards Division attempted to extinguish the fire, the resultant explosion killed 15 civilian station staff and 27 soldiers. A memorial to the event was erected at the station in 1957.

Passenger statistics
In fiscal 2019, the station was used by an average of 2783 passengers daily (boarding passengers only).

Surrounding area
 Sanmu City Hall
 Sanmu Police Station

See also
 List of railway stations in Japan

References

External links

 JR East station information 

Railway stations in Japan opened in 1897
Railway stations in Chiba Prefecture
Buildings and structures in Japan destroyed during World War II
Sōbu Main Line
Tōgane Line
Sanmu